Tears is a solo album by pianist Paul Bley recorded in France in 1983 and released on the French Owl label the following year.

Reception 

Allmusic awarded the album 4 stars calling it "one of Paul Bley's solo piano masterworks".

Track listing
All compositions by Paul Bley except as indicated
 "Tears" - 6:31
 "Ostinato" - 3:34
 "Music Matador" (Prince Lasha, Sonny Simmons) - 5:07
 "Walkman" - 4:00
 "Flame" - 3:48
 "Hardly" - 1:48
 "Head Over Heels" - 5:16
 "Solo Rose" - 3:40
 "For Roy E." - 3:01

Personnel 
Paul Bley - piano

References 

1984 albums
Paul Bley albums
Solo piano jazz albums